Popov is a rural locality (a khutor) in Trostyanskoye Rural Settlement, Novoanninsky District, Volgograd Oblast, Russia. The population was 250 as of 2010. There are 11 streets.

Geography 
Popov is located in forest steppe on the Khopyorsko-Buzulukskaya Plain, 66 km southeast of Novoanninsky (the district's administrative centre) by road. Atamanovsky is the nearest rural locality.

References 

Rural localities in Novoanninsky District